Walter J. Singleton was a journalist and civil servant in Omaha, Nebraska and Washington, D.C. He was an editor of the Omaha Progress and a member of the Afro-American League, a predecessor of the NAACP. In Washington D.C. he worked as a clerk for the Department of War and was active in a number of intellectual and social clubs.

Life
Walter J. Singleton was born in Virginia near Washington, DC in about 1860. He married Minnie B. Green, daughter of Johnson Green and Mary Jane Bradshaw. In the 1880s, he moved with his brother, Millard F. Singleton, to Omaha, Nebraska. He died July 1, 1933.

Career

Omaha
In Nebraska, he was active in state politics. He was associated with the states first black legislator, M. O. Rickets, and in 1890, he helped form a Nebraska branch of the Afro-American League in Omaha, where he was an officer He was an editor of the black paper, Omaha Progress founded by Ferdinand L. Barnett.

District of Columbia
In December 1898 he was appointed to the employ of the United States Department of the Treasury by Secretary of War and former congressman from Nebraska, George de Rue Meiklejohn, where he first served as a messenger. He transferred to a clerkship in the office of the Secretary of the War Department and then as a clerk in the Bureau of Insular Affairs in the War Department.

In 1908 he served as president of the Young Men's Protective League in Washington D.C. He presidency of the group was tumultuous, as he faced two legal battles during his first term. However, he was reelected in 1909.

In the 1910s he was an active member of the Washington DC Mu-So-Lit club, representing DCs Musical, Social, and Literary professionals
. In 1917 he served as president of the group with first vice president Lafayette M. Hershaw and second vice president R. W. Thompson. He was also involved in the black branch of the Association of Oldest Inhabitants of the District of Columbia, serving on the board of directors in 1919.

Also in 1919, Singleton along with Henry Lassiter, L. M. Hershaw, Archibald Grimké, and Robert H. Terrell was a prime mover in the introduction by Congressman Martin B. Madden of a law (H.R. No. 376) to abolish the "Jim Crow" car. The Madden Amendment to the Esch–Cummins Act failed.

At the time of his death in 1933, he was president of the Banneker Relief Association, which provided financial support to poor members and assisted with burial fees, of which he had been an officer since the 1900s

References

Nebraska Republicans
People from Omaha, Nebraska
African-American life in Omaha, Nebraska
Activists for African-American civil rights
1933 deaths